These are the list of results that England have played from 1880 to 1889. No fixtures were fulfilled in 1888 .

A standard points scoring system was at the time undeveloped .

1880 
Scores and results list England's points tally first.

1881 
Scores and results list England's points tally first.

1882 
Scores and results list England's points tally first.

1883 
Scores and results list England's points tally first.

1884 
Scores and results list England's points tally first.

1885 
Scores and results list England's points tally first.

1886 
Scores and results list England's points tally first.

1887 
Scores and results list England's points tally first.

1888 

Home Nations teams refused to play England following the England Rugby Football Union's decision not to join the International Rugby Board .

1889 
Scores and results list England's points tally first.

Year Box

Notes 

1880–89
1880–81 in English rugby union
1881–82 in English rugby union
1882–83 in English rugby union
1883–84 in English rugby union
1884–85 in English rugby union
1885–86 in English rugby union
1886–87 in English rugby union
1888–89 in English rugby union